Amsterdam Island cattle were a rare feral breed of cattle (Bos taurus) that were introduced in 1871 and existed in isolation on Amsterdam Island, a small French territory in the southern Indian Ocean. The population was eradicated in 2010 in the course of an environmental restoration program.

History
A party led by Heurtin, a French farmer (sometimes described as a peasant) from Réunion island, on 18 January 1871 attempted to settle the uninhabited 55 km2 island. After seven months, their attempts to raise sheep and cattle and grow crops had been unfruitful and they departed on 19 August, abandoning their livestock, including five cattle, on the island.

Over the next century or so a combination of factors caused further ecological devastation of the island, which had already been impacted by the introduction of invasive species of plants and animals, as well as by unrestricted hunting, timber-cutting and wildfire caused by sealers and other visitors.  The Amsterdam duck and several species of petrel became extinct, and the breeding population of the endemic Amsterdam Island albatross, previously thought to be a subspecies of the wandering albatross, was reduced to just five pairs.

When the native Phylica arborea (syn. Phylica nitida) forest was almost entirely destroyed, grazing by the increasing numbers of cattle prevented natural regeneration.  The original five cattle had grown to about 2000, which occupied an area of 3000 ha, at a density of 0.64 individuals per hectare.  The only part of the island the cattle did not unoccupy was the Plateau des Tourbières, over 550 m above sea level.

Although the cattle posed a threat to the island's environment, they formed one of the very few herds of feral Bos taurus anywhere in the world. In 1987 a fence was built across the island in order to mitigate the damage the cattle were imposing on the flora and fauna of Amsterdam, as well as to preserve the breed because of scientific interest in its isolation-derived genetic character.  During 1988 and 1989 the 1059 cattle south of the fence were culled. Subsequently, the cattle were restricted to the northern part of Amsterdam. About 50-80 mainly adult and subadult males out of a herd of about 350 individuals were shot each year to provide fresh meat for the inhabitants of the Martin-de-Viviès research station, the only settlement on the island.

In 2007, after a study showed that the areas that were not grazed were recolonized by native plants, it was decided to kill all of the remaining cattle on the island. An association of people who had been wintering on the island tried to oppose the decision, but in vain. The slaughter began in 2008 and ended in 2010.

Description
Sea captain Charles C. Dixon described an encounter with the cattle ca. 1900:

The cattle were descended from French stock present on Réunion at the time of their introduction, including Jersey, Tarentaise, Grey Alpine, and Breton Black Pied breeds. They were generally small-bodied, with medium-length horns, and exhibited a variety of colour patterns, including one that was reminiscent of the aurochs. Adult male cattle had an average weight of about 390 kg, while adult females weighed about 290 kg.

See also
Feral cattle

Citations and references

Citations

References
 
 
 
 

Île Amsterdam
Cattle breeds
Feral cattle